Determination is a positive emotional feeling that involves persevering towards a difficult goal in spite of obstacles. Determination occurs prior to goal attainment and serves to motivate behavior that will help achieve one's goal. Empirical research suggests that people consider determination to be an emotion; in other words, determination is not just a cognitive state, but rather an affective state. In the psychology literature, researchers have studied determination under other terms, including challenge and anticipatory enthusiasm; this may explain one reason for the relative lack of research on determination compared to other positive emotions.

In the field of psychology, emotion research is heavily focused on negative emotions and the action tendencies that they encourage. However, recent work in positive psychology incorporates the study of determination as a positive emotion that pushes individuals toward action and results in important outcomes such as perseverance and determination take success.

Etymology
The word determination comes from the Latin word , meaning "limit" or "determination, end result". It is derived from the verb , meaning "confine; designate," with the abstract noun suffix -. The meaning shifted from "end result, decision" to its present meaning.

Major theories

Self-determination theory
Self-determination theory (SDT) is a theory of motivation and dedication towards our ambition. It focuses on the interplay between individual personalities and experiences in social contexts that results in motivations of the autonomous and controlled kind. SDT also involves both autonomous motivation and controlled motivation. An example of autonomous motivation would be doing something because of intrinsic motivation, or because there is an internal desire to accomplish something. An example of controlled motivation would be doing something because there is outside pressure to accomplish a goal. Ultimately, social environments seem to have a profound effect on both intrinsic and extrinsic motivation and self-regulation. More specifically, self-determination theory proposes that social and cultural factors influence an individual's sense of personal volition and initiative in regards to goals, performance and well-being. High levels of determination and personal volition are supported by conditions that foster autonomy (e.g., individual may have multiple options/choices), competence (e.g., positive feedback) and relatedness (e.g., stable connection to the group an individual is working within).

Bio-psychosocial model
Emotions researchers continue to search for specific physiological patterns associated with discrete positive emotions; however, the frequent blending of emotions makes drawing such distinctions difficult. In relation to challenge and determination, psychologists have concluded it is best to focus on physiological activation in relation to the individual's intended actions (what he/she is determined to do) rather than how the individual subjectively feels.

Researchers associate effort (action tendency) with challenge and determination; thus, a challenged/determined individual should experience physiological arousal that reflects effort. By focusing on the sympathetic nervous system (SNS), systolic blood pressure (SBP) can be used to measure activation that subsequently indicates increased effort. This means that, individuals who are introduced to a challenging task will experience an increase in SBP when they become determined to complete said task. Furthermore, this increased cardiac output is coupled with lowered total peripheral resistance; meaning, while the heart is pumping faster, the vasculature is relaxed. This finding displays an important distinction between the physiological reaction of an individual motivated by challenge and one motivated by threat or fear. Ultimately, there seems to be a specific physiological pattern associated with determination. The identification of said pattern is valuable as it may be used in research aimed at eliciting and studying the antecedents and consequences of this common positive emotion.

Appraisal theory
Appraisal theory proposes that determination has three cognitive appraisal components. These appraisals are evaluations of how the environment and situational circumstances interact with aspects of the individual to create meaning and influence emotional experience.

In particular, experiences of determination are evoked by appraisals of motivational relevance, which refers to whether a situation is relevant to an individual's commitments and goals; motivational incongruence, which refers to whether a situation is incongruent with an individual's commitments and goals; and high problem-focused coping potential, which refers to whether a situation is evaluated to be one that an individual can deal with by using active coping strategies such as planning and problem-solving. These appraisal components combine to bring on experiences of determination that then motivate the tendency to persevere and strive towards mastery. In accordance with this behavioral tendency, appraisal theory proposes that determination is associated with effortful optimism, referring to the belief that a situation can be improved upon with enough effort from the individual.

Empirical findings

Emotional experience
Research using direct brain stimulation showed that electrical stimulation to the anterior midcingulate cortex elicits a response that mirrors the emotional experience of determination. In this case study of two epileptic seizure patients, participants reported feeling determined to overcome an approaching challenge; this emotion was reported to feel pleasant, rather than unpleasant. Following electrical stimulation, participants exhibited elevated cardiovascular activity and reported a warm feeling in their upper chest and neck. This work supports the idea that determination is a positive emotion that prepares an individual to overcome obstacles.

Another study compared determination and pride to see how these two positive emotions differentially influenced perseverance in the context of a mathematical problem-solving task. Using a directed imagery task in which participants listened to and imagined a particular scenario, emotion was differentially induced in participants. The results suggested that determination enhanced task engagement and perseverance, with participants in this group spending significantly more time on the most difficult problem in the task.

In contrast, pride decreased task engagement and perseverance relative to a neutral condition, with participants in this group spending significantly less time on the most difficult problem in the task. This research further supports the notion that determination motivates perseverance, perhaps more so than other positive emotions that have been theorized to be associated with perseverance.

Emotional expression
Experiences of determination are linked to a recognizable facial expression that involves frowning of the eyebrows, an expression that is perceptually similar to anger. This eyebrow frown is associated with the perception of goal obstacles, supporting the notion that determination is associated with the action tendency of preparing to overcome difficult obstacles in goal pursuit.

Intrinsic and extrinsic motivation
Internal motivation is an internal drive, curiosity, or desire to learn that is within human beings. It drives people to learn new things or to put things into action. Intrinsic motivation is often evident when people desire to try new things or find ways to overcome challenges. Intrinsic motivation is often what drives a person to start something, but extrinsic motivation is often what helps people to accomplish their goals. Extrinsic motivation is the external drive that motivates action. It can include things like going to work daily to pay one's bills, or obeying the law to stay out of trouble. This type of motivation is not driven by one's own desires but instead by outside sources.

Applications

Classroom, workplace, and family environment

Assuming that determination is influenced by the emotion of challenge and the expectations placed on an individual by their social context, determination is fostered in educational, occupational and familial environments that encourage men and women. If an individual is provided resources and surrounded by people who believe they are capable of goal achievement, said individual is more likely to experienced increases in determination and subsequent improvement in performance and well-being.

For example, research has shown that students enrolled in positive learning environments where teachers incorporate strategies meant to meet students' motivational needs (i.e., encouragement aimed at intrinsic rewards, using student-directed forms of discipline) are more likely to become responsible learners who display a determination to succeed.

In the essay "College Pressures" by William Zinsser, the pressures faced by college students at Yale are studied. The pressures include the need to develop time management and study skills appropriate for college and university work, the desire for good grades, the desire to meet parents' expectations, and the need to find employment in a competitive job market after graduation.

Health and well-being
Various studies have linked challenge and determination to increases in physical health and mental well-being. Some specific positive outcomes include illness resistance, increased survival rates and decreased levels of depression. An individual experiences positive personal growth when they are able to proactively cope with a difficult situation. In such a case, an individual can acknowledge a demanding situation, take action and maintain high coping potential. More broadly, one can acknowledge the benefits of a difficult experience yet display a willingness to put forth an effort and achieve specific personal goals.

Interpersonal relationships
In the interpersonal domain, challenge appraisals are key to successful dealings with interpersonal conflict. For example, young children exposed to bullying are more likely to seek social support and report said bullying. A bullied child utilizing a challenge appraisal is more likely to frame bullying in a way that posits the unfortunate situation as an opportunity to rely on others and work towards a positive solution. In this case, the child can still remain autonomous because he/she is acting independently to engage others. Ultimately, challenge and determination promote goal mastery and are related to increased confidence and decreased evaluation apprehension; thus, determined individuals using challenge appraisals are confident in their abilities to handle an adverse situation; however, they are not above asking for help when it is needed.

See also

References

Positive psychology
Leadership
Personality
Virtue